Lady Lucinda Lambton, also known as Lady Lucinda Worsthorne (born 10 May 1943) is an English writer, photographer, and broadcaster on architectural subjects.

Life
Lucinda Lambton was born in Newcastle upon Tyne, the eldest child of the Conservative defence minister Lord Lambton. The family lived in County Durham and London, where her sister Anne Lambton, later to become an actress, was born in 1954.

Lambton spent six years at Queen's Gate School, London, then went to a finishing school in Florence, but she ended her education without gaining any qualifications and became a professional photographer working for various newspapers including the Evening Standard. Her first assignment was working for the historian Frank Atkinson who was collecting artefacts to form the basis of Beamish Museum in County Durham.

Personal life
On 16 January 1965, Lambton married Henry Mark Harrod, eldest son of Sir Roy Harrod. They were divorced in 1973. In January 1986 she married secondly Sir Edmund Cameron-Ramsay-Fairfax-Lucy, 6th Baronet, and divorced him in 1989. In May 1991 she married thirdly the journalist Sir Peregrine Worsthorne, and they stayed together until his death in October 2020.

Career
Lambton has researched, written and presented 55 films for the BBC and 25 films for ITV. They include On The Throne – The History of the Lavatory, The Great North Road,  A Cabinet of Curiosities and  The Other House of Windsor. Sublime Suburbia, her series of four films for ITV about the architectural and historic delights of London's suburbs, won the Regional Television award for the best documentary series of 2003. A further series of Sublime Suburbia in six parts, followed in 2004.

She has written and taken the photographs for 14 books including: Temples of Convenience, a history of the lavatory; Beastly Buildings, about architecture for animals; Vanishing Victoriana; An Album of Curious Houses and Lucinda Lambton's A-Z of Britain, a companion to the 26-part television series for the BBC.

Lambton has made presentations, often illustrated with her own slides, throughout the British Isles, and in America. She has been sponsored by the National Art Collections Fund at the Royal Geographical Society, and provided several of the annual talks for the National Trust at The Royal Festival Hall. She has also travelled on board the QE2 to speak for the National Trust and the Royal Oak Foundation and she has spoken at the Los Angeles County Museum of Art. She sometimes opens new buildings and museums, and hosts architectural and canine prize giving events.

She has made several series for BBC Radio 4, including Bringing the House Down, Elevations and Revelations, Pride of Place, an argument against modern architecture, Hidden Treasures and Listed, illuminating efforts of the Twentieth Century Society to save notable post-World War II buildings. She has been a castaway on Desert Island Discs.

Lambton is a regular contributor to newspapers and magazines, including The Daily Telegraph, The Times, Country Life, the Daily Mail and The Oldie.

She is an Honorary Fellow of the Royal Institute of British Architects and an honorary member of the Chelsea Arts Club, as well as President of the Avoncroft Museum of Historic Buildings. She is a patron of the Cinema Theatre Association. She is an Honorary Vice President of The Crossness Engines Trust. She is president of the Garden History Society.

See also
 Lucy Worsley – another BBC presenter on historical topics

References

1943 births
Living people
British non-fiction writers
British architecture writers
British television presenters
Lambton family
People educated at Queen's Gate School
Writers from Newcastle upon Tyne
Daughters of British earls
Country Life (magazine) people
Wives of baronets
Wives of knights